Nikolay Nikolayevich Nosov (in Kyiv – 26 July 1976 in Moscow) was a Soviet and Ukrainian children's literature writer, the author of a number of humorous short stories, a school novel, and the popular trilogy of fairy tale novels about the adventures of Dunno and his friends.

Early life
He was born in a family of an estrada artist. From 1927 to 1929 he was a student of Kyiv Institute of Art, from where he moved to Gerasimov Institute of Cinematography, from which he graduated in 1932.

Career
The literary debut of Nosov was in 1938. In 1932 – 1951 he worked as a producer of animated and educational films, including ones for the Red Army, having earned the Order of the Red Star in 1943.

In 1938 Nosov began to publish his stories, including Zatejniki (roughly translates as Jokers); Alive Hat, Cucumbers, Miraculous Trousers, and Dreamers. These stories were published mainly in the magazine for children Murzilka and many of them make up the foundation of the Nosov's first collection Rat-tat-tat, 1945). Nosov introduced a new hero, naïve and sensible, naughty and curious fidget obsessed by craving for activities and always getting into unusual, often comic situations – into children's literature.

The most popular works became his stories for teenagers Merry Family (1949), The Kolya Sinitsyn's Diary (1950), Vitya Maleev at School and at Home (1951). This last one received State Stalin Prize in 1952.

Long-term fame and love of readers were gained by his fairy stories about Dunno (Neznaika). The first of those is the fairy tale Vintik, Shpuntik and vacuum cleaner. Further the hero appeared in the famous trilogy consisting of fairy tale novels The Adventures of Dunno and His Friends (1953–1954), Dunno in Sun City (1958), and Dunno on the Moon (1964–1965).

The writer is also the author of an autobiographical work Story about My Friend Igor (1971–1972) and a memoirs narrative Mystery on a Well Bottom (1977).

Death 
Nosov died on 26 July 1976 in Moscow, RSFSR, Soviet Union at age of 67, He was buried at Kuntsevo Cemetery

Works

Tribute
On 23 November 2018, a Google Doodle was displayed to celebrate his 110th birthday.

References

External links
Neznaika
Nikolai Nosov
Nikolai Nosov, The Adventures of Dunno and His Friends
Children's Books in Soviet Russia. From October Revolution 1917 to Perestroika 1986
Reviews of Neznaika trilogy books by Layla AR
Jolly Family
School Boys
Kolya Sinitsin's Diary
Mishka's Porridge and Other Stories

1908 births
1976 deaths
20th-century male writers
20th-century Russian dramatists and playwrights
20th-century Russian writers
20th-century short story writers
Writers from Kyiv
Russian children's writers
Russian male writers
Russian short story writers
Soviet children's writers
Soviet dramatists and playwrights
Soviet male writers
Soviet short story writers
Stalin Prize winners
Recipients of the Order of the Red Banner of Labour
Recipients of the Order of the Red Star
Burials at Kuntsevo Cemetery